LNG Esports, formerly known as Snake Esports, is a Chinese professional esports organization based in Suzhou. Its League of Legends team competes in the League of Legends Pro League (LPL), the top-level league for the game in China, and plays home games at the Yangcheng International Esports Center in Suzhou.

History 
Snake Esports announced on 21 May 2019 that they had been acquired by athletic apparel company Li-Ning and that they were rebranding as LNG Esports. Top laner Li "Flandre" Xuanjun, jungler Lê "SofM" Quang Duy, mid laner Huang "Fenfen" Chen, bot laner Lu "Asura" Qi and support Hu "Maestro" Jianxin remained on the team following the acquisition. To complete LNG's inaugural roster, mid laner Bae "Plex" Ho-young and support Duan "Duan" De-Liang were acquired from Griffin and Vici Gaming respectively.

LNG placed seventh in the 2019 LPL Summer regular season, qualifying for the first round of playoffs. After sweeping Invictus Gaming in the first round, LNG lost to Royal Never Give Up in the quarterfinals.

In late 2019, LNG announced several roster changes, dropping SofM, Plex, Fenfen, and Maestro, and signing jungler Xiong "Xx" Yulong, rookie support Liao "lwandy" Dingyang, and Taiwanese veteran mid laner Huang "Maple" Yi-tang. Bot laner Wang "Light" Guangyu was also promoted from LNG's academy team. This revamped roster's first tournament was the 2019 Demacia Cup, in which they placed third in their group and failed to qualify for the knockout stage (i.e. playoffs). Aside from promoting top laner Zhou "chenlun17" Pengyuan, LNG did not make any other changes to their starting roster during the 2020 season. LNG placed 16th in the spring split and 13th in the summer split, both times ending with a 5–11 record.

LNG announced on 17 December 2020 that they had made several major changes to their roster. Top laner Chang "M1kuya" Xiao, mid laner Xie "icon" Tianyu, and most notably Korean star jungler Lee "Tarzan" Seung-yong had been acquired from SDX Gaming, OMG, and Griffin respectively. Despite these roster changes, in the 2020 Demacia Cup LNG once again finished third in their group and failed to qualify for the knockout stage. Hu "Ale" Jiale was subsequently acquired from TT Gaming and signed as a substitute top laner for the 2021 season.

LNG placed tenth in the 2021 LPL Spring regular season and qualified for the first round of playoffs, where they were swept by Suning. LNG had a stronger showing in the summer split, placing eight in the regular season and taking upset victories over several higher-placed teams. However, LNG's summer playoff run was ended in the fourth round (i.e. quarterfinals) by Edward Gaming, which would go on to win that split's title. LNG's overall placements in the spring and summer splits earned them a spot in the 2021 LPL Regional Finals, where they defeated Rare Atom and Team WE to qualify for the 2021 World Championship.

Roster

References

External links 
 

2013 establishments in China
Esports teams established in 2013
Esports teams based in China
League of Legends Pro League teams